Fox Lake Airport  is located  northwest of Fox Lake, Alberta, Canada.

References

External links
Page about this airport on COPA's Places to Fly airport directory

Registered aerodromes in Alberta
Mackenzie County